HC Kaustik Volgograd is a Russian handball team located in Volgograd. They compete in the Russian Handball Super League.

In reaction to the 2022 Russian invasion of Ukraine, the International Handball Federation banned Russian athletes, and the European Handball Federation suspended the  Russian clubs from competing in European handball competitions.

Accomplishments

Russian Handball Super League: 
Winners (4) : 1996, 1997, 1998, 1999

References

External links 

 EHF Club profile

Sport in Volgograd
Russian handball clubs